Lecane is a genus of rotifers belonging to the family Lecanidae. It is the only genus in the monotypic family Lecanidae and has a cosmopolitan distribution

Species
The following species are recognised in the genus Colurella:

Lecane abanica 
Lecane acanthinula 
Lecane aculeata 
Lecane acus 
Lecane aeganea 
Lecane affinis 
Lecane agilis 
Lecane althausi 
Lecane amazonica 
Lecane arcuata 
Lecane arcula 
Lecane armata 
Lecane aspasia 
Lecane asymmetrica 
Lecane baimaii 
Lecane balatonica 
Lecane batillifer 
Lecane bidactyla 
Lecane bifastigata 
Lecane bifurca 
Lecane blachei 
Lecane boettgeri 
Lecane boliviana 
Lecane boorali 
Lecane branchicola 
Lecane braumi 
Lecane braziliensis 
Lecane broaensis 
Lecane bryophila 
Lecane bulla 
Lecane calcaria 
Lecane candida 
Lecane carpatica 
Lecane chinesensis 
Lecane clara 
Lecane climacois 
Lecane closterocerca 
Lecane copeis 
Lecane cornuta 
Lecane crenata 
Lecane crepida 
Lecane curvicornis 
Lecane decipiens 
Lecane depressa 
Lecane deridderae 
Lecane difficilis 
Lecane donneri 
Lecane donyanaensis 
Lecane dorysimilis
Lecane doryssa 
Lecane dumonti 
Lecane dysorata 
Lecane elasma 
Lecane elegans 
Lecane elliptoides 
Lecane elongata 
Lecane elsa 
Lecane enowi 
Lecane ercodes 
Lecane eswari 
Lecane eutarsa 
Lecane eylesi 
Lecane fadeevi 
Lecane flabellata 
Lecane flexilis 
Lecane flexlils
Lecane formosa 
Lecane furcata 
Lecane fusilis 
Lecane galeata 
Lecane gallagherorum 
Lecane gillardi 
Lecane gissensis 
Lecane glandulosa 
Lecane goniata 
Lecane gracilis 
Lecane grandis 
Lecane gwileti 
Lecane haliclysta 
Lecane halsei 
Lecane hamata 
Lecane hastata 
Lecane herzigi 
Lecane hornemanni 
Lecane hospes 
Lecane imbricata 
Lecane inconspicua 
Lecane inermis 
Lecane infula 
Lecane inopinata 
Lecane inquieta 
Lecane insulaconae 
Lecane intrasinuata 
Lecane isanensis 
Lecane ivli 
Lecane jaintiaensis 
Lecane jessupi 
Lecane junki 
Lecane kluchor 
Lecane kunthuleensis 
Lecane kutikowa 
Lecane lamellata 
Lecane langsenensis 
Lecane lateralis 
Lecane latissima 
Lecane lauterborni 
Lecane leontina 
Lecane leura 
Lecane levistyla 
Lecane ligona 
Lecane ludwigii 
Lecane luna 
Lecane lunaris 
Lecane lungae 
Lecane marchantaria 
Lecane margalefi 
Lecane margarethae 
Lecane marshi 
Lecane martensi 
Lecane matsaluensis 
Lecane mawsoni 
Lecane melini 
Lecane minuta 
Lecane mira 
Lecane mitella 
Lecane mitis 
Lecane monostyla 
Lecane mucronata 
Lecane myersi 
Lecane namatai 
Lecane nana 
Lecane nelsoni 
Lecane nigeriensis 
Lecane niothis 
Lecane nitida 
Lecane niwati 
Lecane noobijupi 
Lecane nwadiaroi 
Lecane obtusa 
Lecane ohiensis 
Lecane ohioensis 
Lecane opias 
Lecane ordwayi 
Lecane palinacis 
Lecane papuana 
Lecane paradoxa 
Lecane pawlowskii 
Lecane paxiana 
Lecane pelatis 
Lecane perplexa 
Lecane perpusilla 
Lecane pertica 
Lecane phapi
Lecane plesia 
Lecane pluto 
Lecane pomiformis 
Lecane proiecta 
Lecane psammophila 
Lecane pumila 
Lecane punctata 
Lecane pusilla 
Lecane pustulosa 
Lecane pycina 
Lecane pyriformis 
Lecane pyrrha 
Lecane quadridentata 
Lecane remanei 
Lecane rhacois 
Lecane rhenana 
Lecane rhopalura 
Lecane rhytida 
Lecane robertsonae 
Lecane romeroi 
Lecane rudescui 
Lecane rugosa 
Lecane rusticula 
Lecane ruttneri 
Lecane sagula 
Lecane satyrus 
Lecane schraederi 
Lecane scutata 
Lecane segersi 
Lecane serrata 
Lecane shieli 
Lecane sibina 
Lecane signifera 
Lecane simonneae 
Lecane sinuata 
Lecane sinuosa 
Lecane sola 
Lecane solfatara 
Lecane spiniventris 
Lecane spinulifera 
Lecane stenroosi 
Lecane stephensae 
Lecane stichaea 
Lecane stichoclysta 
Lecane stokesii 
Lecane styrax 
Lecane subtilis 
Lecane subulata 
Lecane sulcata 
Lecane superaculeata 
Lecane sverigis 
Lecane sylviae 
Lecane symoensi 
Lecane sympoda 
Lecane syngenes 
Lecane tabida 
Lecane tabulifera 
Lecane tanganyikae 
Lecane tenua 
Lecane tenuiseta 
Lecane thailandensis 
Lecane thalera 
Lecane thienemanni 
Lecane tryphema 
Lecane tuxeni 
Lecane uenoi 
Lecane undulata 
Lecane unguitata 
Lecane ungulata 
Lecane urna 
Lecane venusta 
Lecane verecunda 
Lecane whitfordi 
Lecane yatseni 
Lecane zhanjiangensis 
Monostyla constricta 
Monostyla dentata 
Monostyla psammophila 
Monostyla sinuata
 BOLD:AAN2893 (Lecane sp.)
 BOLD:AAN2894 (Lecane sp.)
 BOLD:AAN3260 (Lecane sp.)
 BOLD:AAP1003 (Lecane sp.)
 BOLD:AAP1004 (Lecane sp.)
 BOLD:AAV7931 (Lecane sp.)
 BOLD:AAX0098 (Lecane sp.)
 BOLD:AAY8775 (Lecane sp.)
 BOLD:AAZ7519 (Lecane sp.)
 BOLD:AAZ8141 (Lecane sp.)
 BOLD:ABA0362 (Lecane sp.)
 BOLD:ABA0369 (Lecane sp.)
 BOLD:ABA0370 (Lecane sp.)
 BOLD:ABA0371 (Lecane sp.)
 BOLD:ABA0475 (Lecane sp.)
 BOLD:ABA7453 (Lecane sp.)
 BOLD:ADW5755 (Lecane sp.)
 BOLD:ADX1966 (Lecane sp.)

References

Rotifer families
Rotifer genera
Ploima